Robert Tuck may refer to:

 Robert J. Tuck (1863–1930), American politician in the Virginia House of Delegates
 Robert Stanford Tuck (1916–1987), British fighter pilot